John Symonds was an English writer.

John Symonds may also refer to:

John Symonds (academic) (1730–1807), professor of modern history at the University of Cambridge
John Addington Symonds (physician) (1807–1871), British author
John Addington Symonds (1840–1893), British poet and literary critic, son of the physician 
John Alexander Symonds (born 1935), British KGB agent
John Jermyn Symonds, New Zealand politician in the 19th century

See also
John Simmonds (disambiguation)
John Simonds (disambiguation)